Port Redwing is a Port of Tampa facility near Gibsonton, Florida. The Port bought 110 acres in the area in 2012. A rail line connection to CSX mainline track is planned as well as roadway connections to Interstate 4 and the Lee Roy Selmon Expressway.

See also
Schultz Preserve

References

Ports and harbors of the Florida Gulf coast
Buildings and structures in Hillsborough County, Florida
Transportation in Hillsborough County, Florida
Tampa Bay